James McCaray was an American football coach.  He served as the head football coach at Arkansas Agricultural, Mechanical & Normal College (Arkansas AM&N)—now known as University of Arkansas at Pine Bluff—for two seasons, from to 1935 to 1936, compiling a record of 9–10–1.

Head coaching record

References

Year of birth missing
Year of death missing
Arkansas–Pine Bluff Golden Lions football coaches